The 1st Toronto International Film Festival (TIFF) took place at Windsor Arms Hotel, Toronto, Ontario, Canada between October 18 and October 24, 1976. Initially its name was Festival of Festivals, which remained until 1994 after which it became the Toronto International Film Festival. It showcased 127 feature films from 30 different countries with the audience of 35,000. It featured some of the best films from film festivals around the world. Most of the Hollywood studios later withdrew their submissions citing reason that Toronto audiences would be too parochial for their films. Cousin Cousine, a French film directed by Jean-Charles Tacchella was selected as the opening film and screened at Ontario Place Cinesphere and Queen of the Gypsies was the closing film. German cinema was focused upon, with films from German directors such as Rainer Werner Fassbinder, Wim Wenders and Werner Herzog.

Producer Dino De Laurentiis, screened a 90-second preview of his then-unreleased King Kong at the festival.

Programme

Gala Presentation
Cousin Cousine by Jean-Charles Tacchella
Illustrious Corpses by Francesco Rosi
Death Race 2000 by Paul Bartel
Queen of the Gypsies by Emil Loteanu
Lumière by Jeanne Moreau
Dersu Uzala by Akira Kurosawa
Adoption by Márta Mészáros
Mother Küsters' Trip to Heaven by Rainer Werner Fassbinder
The Devil's Playground by Fred Schepisi
Bernice Bobs Her Hair by Joan Micklin Silver
The Best Way to Walk by Claude Miller
Kings of the Road by Wim Wenders
Heart of Glass by Werner Herzog
Herfra min verden går by Christian Braad Thomsen
Hustruer by Anja Breien
Cantata de Chile by Humberto Solás
Scandalo by Salvatore Samperi
Harvest: 3,000 Years by Haile Gerima
Independence Day  by Bobby Roth

Canadian Cinema 
The Canadian Cinema program had been slated to include Don Owen's film Partners, but it was pulled from the festival at the last minute after a dispute with the Ontario Censor Board about a brief sex scene in the film.

The Absence (L'Absence) by Brigitte Sauriol
The Little Girl Who Lives Down the Lane by Nicolas Gessner
A Pacemaker and a Sidecar (L'Eau chaude, l'eau frette) by André Forcier
The Supreme Kid by Peter Bryant

Documentaries
Grey Gardens by Albert Maysles, David Maysles, Ellen Hovde and Muffie Meyer
Harlan County, USA by Barbara Kopple
Small Change by François Truffaut
Hollywood on Trial by David Helpern
Not a Pretty Picture by Martha Coolidge

References

External links
 Official site
 TIFF: A Reel History: 1976 - 2012

1976
1976 film festivals
1976 in Toronto
1976 in Canadian cinema